Andy Ruiz Jr. vs Anthony Joshua II, billed as Clash On The Dunes, was a  heavyweight professional boxing rematch between the Mexican-American champion Andy Ruiz Jr. and British former champion Anthony Joshua, for the unified WBA (Super), IBF, WBO and IBO heavyweight world titles. The event took place on December 7, 2019, at the Diriyah Arena, Diriyah, Saudi Arabia. Joshua won the bout via unanimous decision. The bout between Ruiz and Joshua was refereed by Luis Pabon.

Background
After losing by seventh-round technical knockout to Andy Ruiz Jr. on June 1, 2019, at Madison Square Garden in New York City in one of the biggest upsets in the history of boxing, Joshua stated in a post-fight interview that he and his team certainly expected to exercise the rematch clause with Ruiz. Four days after the fight took place, Joshua's promoter and group managing director of Matchroom Sport Eddie Hearn announced on social media platforms that Joshua's management team triggered the contractual rematch clause with Ruiz.

Saudi Arabian authorities reportedly paid £30million to host the event in Saudi Arabia.

International broadcasters 
The fight was streamed live on Fight Sports MAX in MENA region (Saudi Arabia as host), DAZN in the United States and seven other countries, and televised live on PPV's Sky Sports Box Office in the United Kingdom and Ireland.

Fight card

Viewership
On Sky Sports Box Office, the fight reportedly broke the all-time UK pay-per-view (PPV) record, according to Eddie Hearn (who said he was told by Sky Sports). The Broadcasters' Audience Research Board (BARB) revealed that Sky Sports Box Office generated 1.284million buys on fight night, and a further 291,000 buys over the following two weeks, totaling  buys in the UK.

On DAZN, the fight was the most streamed event of 2019. It was watched live by approximately 1.8million DAZN subscribers across nine markets, according to The Athletic boxing journalist Mike Coppinger, who also said the fight drew 200,000 new subscribers, with most from the United States.

See also
Anthony Joshua vs. Andy Ruiz Jr.

References

External links 
 Official website

2019 in boxing
2019 in Saudi Arabian sport
International Boxing Federation heavyweight championship matches
World Boxing Association heavyweight championship matches
World Boxing Organization heavyweight championship matches
International Boxing Organization heavyweight championship matches
Boxing in Asia
Sport in Riyadh
Sports competitions in Saudi Arabia
Pay-per-view boxing matches
DAZN
Boxing matches involving Anthony Joshua